Trent McKeegan (born 2000) is an Irish cricketer.

A member of Newbuildings Cricket Club, McKeegan played age group cricket for the North West Cricket Union in 2017. In 2020, he raised £5,000 for Altnagelvin Hospital in Derry in memory of his grandfather, Alan Wallace, who was an umpire in the North-West of Ireland, by running 75 miles in three days. McKeegan is employed by the Pharmacy Department at the hospital. McKeegan was called up to the North West Warriors squad for their opening matches in the 2022 Inter-Provincial Cup, but did not feature in the starting eleven. His debut for the North West Warriors came in a Twenty20 match against the Northern Knights in the 2022 Inter-Provincial Trophy festival at Comber, with McKeegan taking the wicket of Max Burton in the match. He played in all three of the Warriors fixtures in the festival, but went wicketless in his next two matches.

References

External links
 

2000 births
Living people
People from Newbuildings
Irish cricketers
North West Warriors cricketers